Gowdy is an unincorporated community in Orange Township, Rush County, in the U.S. state of Indiana.

History
Gowdy was founded in 1830. The community bears the name of a local family.

A post office was established at Gowdy in 1890, and remained in operation until it was discontinued in 1903.

Geography
In terms with agricultural zones, it is located in zone 5.

References

Unincorporated communities in Rush County, Indiana
Unincorporated communities in Indiana